MindModeling@Home is a non-profit, volunteer computing research project for the advancement of cognitive science.  MindModeling@Home is hosted by Wright State University and the University of Dayton in Dayton, Ohio.

In BOINC, it is in the area of Cognitive Science and category called Cognitive science and artificial intelligence. It can only operate on a 64-bit operating system, preferably on a computer with multiple cores, running a Microsoft Windows, Mac OS X, or Linux operating system. This project is not compatible with mobile devices, unlike other projects on BOINC.

Research focus 
 N-2 Repetition: understanding how people have a harder time returning to a task from another one
 Observing how people read through their eye movement for the purpose of helping people reduce eye strain and processing what they read better and faster.
 Modeling decision-making: resolving around decisions made from visual processing (focus and filtering) 
 Integrated Learning Models (ILM) to create algorithms based on how people learn and make decisions
 How the brain performs tasks sequentially and simultaneously by measuring its blood flow

Problems 

 Its status is inactive. However, it is "not down or closed," as its servers are still running.
 The projects are long; prolonged amounts of computing time can overheat a computer. The solution is to stop work on the project until the computer cools down.
 It is subject to power outages, as seen on October 7, 2018
 When the website will be out of beta mode is unresolved, as it has been going like this since 2007

Scientific results 
 
 Godwin H.J., Walenchok S. et al. Faster than the speed of rejection: Object identification processes during visual search for multiple targets. J Exp Psychol Hum Percept Perform. 41-4, (2016).
 Moore L. R., Gunzelmann G. An interpolation approach for fitting computationally intensive models. Cognitive Systems Research 19, (2014).
 Moore L.R. Cognitive model exploration and optimization: a new challenge for computational science. Comput Math Organ Theory 17, 296–313. (2011).
 Moore L.R., Kopala M., Mielke T. et al. Simultaneous performance exploration and optimized search with volunteer computing. 19th ACM International Symposium on High Performance Distributed Computing, (2010).
 Harris J., Gluck K.A., Moore L.R. MindModeling@Home. . . and Anywhere Else You Have Idle Processors. 9th International Conference on Cognitive Modelling, (2009).
 Gluck K., Scheutz M.  Combinatorics meets processing power: Large-scale computational resources for BRIMS. 16th Conference on Behavior Representation in Modeling and Simulation, BRIMS. 1. 73-83. (2007).

See also 
List of volunteer computing projects

References

External links 
 
BOINC
 
 

Science in society
Free science software
Volunteer computing projects
Cognitive modeling
Wright State University
University of Dayton